Chanda Rubin was the defending champion, but chose not compete that year.

Jana Novotná won the title, defeating Dominique Van Roost in the final, 6–1, 7–6(7–2).

Seeds
A champion seed is indicated in bold text while text in italics indicates the round in which that seed was eliminated. The top four seeds received a bye to the second round.

  Jana Novotná (champion)
  Iva Majoli (semifinals)
  Nathalie Tauziat (quarterfinals)
  Dominique Van Roost (final)
  Lisa Raymond (quarterfinals)
  Yayuk Basuki (first round)
  Sabine Appelmans (semifinals)
  Anna Kournikova (quarterfinals)

Draw

Finals

Section 1

Section 2

External links
 1998 EA-Generali Ladies Linz Draw

1998 WTA Tour